Agios Ilias ( "Saint Elias";  "village of a cliff", previously ) is a village in the Famagusta District of Cyprus, located  north-east of Trikomo. It is under the de facto control of Northern Cyprus.

Traditionally, Agios Ilias was primarily inhabited by Greek-speaking Orthodox Christians. In 1973, it had 355 inhabitants, all of whom were Greek Cypriot. In August 1974, they were forced to flee their village by the approaching Turkish army. Today, Agios Ilias is inhabited by settlers from the Denizli Province of Turkey.

The first school was established in the village during the Ottoman period, in 1865. Before then, the village priests (and perhaps monks) provided some teaching from religious books held in the church.

References

Communities in Famagusta District
Populated places in İskele District